The anthem of the Beiyang Fleet  ( Hanyu Pinyin: Běiyáng hǎijūn jūngē) is the official anthem of Beiyang Fleet, Qing Dynasty, and was presumed lost after the defeat of the Beiyang Fleet in the First Sino-Japanese war. The piece was re-discovered by Yue Chen in the archives of the Royal Navy in the United Kingdom in 2012. A modern adaptation was arranged by Xue Ye for the People's Liberation Army Navy. The documentary Rise and Fall of Beiyang Fleet presented by CCTV uses this anthem as its theme music.

The anthem shares the same tune with Tune of Li Zhongtang.

Lyrics

Traditional Chinese
寶祚延庥萬國歡
景星拱極五雲端
海波澄碧春輝麗 
旌節花間集鳳鸞

Simplified Chinese 
宝祚延庥万国欢
景星拱极五云端
海波澄碧春辉丽 
旌节花间集凤鸾

Hanyu Pinyin
Bǎozuò yánxiū wànguó huān
Jǐngxīng gǒngjí wǔ yún duān
Hǎibō chéngbì chūnhuī lì
Jīngjié huājiān jí fèngluán

English Translation
Ten thousand nations celebrate the Imperial throne's prosperity
The fortune star climbs over the iridescent clouds of five colors
The crystal blue ocean glitters under spring's sunshine
Tributaries bow to the Emperor like flowers centering a phoenix

See also 
Beiyang Fleet

References

External links 

Anthem of the Beiyang Fleet on Youtube
Another version of the "Anthem of the Beiyang Fleet on Youtube

Military history of the Qing dynasty
Beiyang Fleet
Naval history of China
Chinese military marches